Nucleobindin-1 (NUCB1), also known as calnuc, is a protein that in humans is encoded by the NUCB1 gene.

Structure 

The human calnuc protein contains 461 amino acids and has a pI of 4.9.

The protein contains the following regions and domains:
 Signal peptide
 Leucine-zipper The leucine-zipper of calnuc may be responsible for its dimerization.
 aa 347-389 – Nuclear localization signal
 2 zinc binding sites with high affinity (Kd = 20 nM)
 carboxypeptidase-like motifs : HFREXnH (aa 66) and HFTEXnH (aa 146)
 2 EF-hands
 Potential anchor region– 15-aa hydrophobic region at its COOH terminus that may be sufficient for membrane anchoring

References

Further reading

EF-hand-containing proteins